The 2014–15 Canisius Golden Griffins men's basketball team represented Canisius College during the 2014–15 NCAA Division I men's basketball season. The Golden Griffins, led by third year head coach Jim Baron, played their home games at the Koessler Athletic Center and were members of the Metro Atlantic Athletic Conference. They finished the season 18–15, 11–9 in MAAC play to finish in fifth place. They lost in the quarterfinals of the MAAC tournament to Monmouth. They were invited to the CollegeInsider.com Tournament where they defeated Dartmouth in the first round and Bowling Green in the second round before losing in the quarterfinals to NJIT.

Roster

Schedule

|-
!colspan=9 style="background:#0B2548; color:#EAAB20;"| Exhibition

|-
!colspan=9 style="background:#0B2548; color:#EAAB20;"| Regular season

|-
!colspan=9 style="background:#0B2548; color:#EAAB20;"|  MAAC tournament

|-
!colspan=9 style="background:#0B2548; color:#EAAB20;"|  CIT

References

Canisius Golden Griffins men's basketball seasons
Canisius
Canisius
Canisius Golden Griffins men's basketball
Canisius Golden Griffins men's basketball